Terje Dragseth is a Norwegian poet, author and film director, born in Kristiansand in 1955. Dragseth made his debut in 1980 with his collection of poems titled "Offerfesten" (The Sermony of Sacrifice). Since then, he's published seventeen poetry collections, and also published poems in anthologies and literary journals. Two books of short stories "Den amerikanske turisten" and Drømmeboka (The Dream book).In 1996, several of his poems written between 1980 and 1995, were published in an anthology, titled "Du. Dikt i utvalg".

Dragseth has also directed several short films since he studied to become a film director in Copenhagen, Denmark, in 1983 to 1987, and he has translated poetic works of both Laura Riding Jackson and Leonard Cohen.
Dragseth also have a rock band I Sing My Body Electric (ismbe.bandcamp.com & Spotify, iTunes, and other digital  music platforms. 
According to the Norwegian literary journal, he has often been characterized as "an ecstatic" in contemporary Norwegian poetry, and he is considered to be one of the most prominent voices of his generation. He has asserted that humanism is central to his work and was awarded The Humanist Award for 1998 by the University of Agder in 1998 and Trizdán Vindtorn Poetry Prize in 2012. F.P. Jacks mindelegat 2018 (Denmark).

42 works in 122 publications in 6 languages and 249 library holding.
Link: https://worldcat.org/identities/lccn-n80018622/

Bibliography 
Original works:
 2021 Epifanier ll. Prose poems.
 2020 Alt jeg er redd for. Poems.
 2018 Drømmeboka.En okkult dagbok.Short stories.
 2017 Sange til dem som tror. Text for mass, music by Peter Bruun
 2017 Epifanier l. Prose poems.
 2015 Jeg skriver språket. A poem. 
 2014 Solen sukker i min sko. (Short stories).
 2012 Bella Blu, Handbook for space. Poems.
 2009: Weisskjäje Sein Lied - Wittreihs leed, Gutleut Verlag, Frankfurt am main. Translation "Kvitekråkas song" by Tone Avenstroup, Bert Papenfuss.
2008: Ti titler: dikt 1980-2005. Ten collection of poems from 1980-2005.
2006: TDZ: publiserte & upubliserte dikt og tekster 1979-2006, (Poems and other texts from 1979-2006))
2005: Metaforenes tyranni? Essays in multi-author anthology
2005: Kvitekråkas song. A poem with CD. (The song of the white Crow).
2002: Logg. Poems.
2000: Fundament for dannelse av kaos. Poems. 
1997: Den amerikanske turisten.Short stories. 
1994: Den sovende. Poems.
1990: Vækst. Poem. ill. by Frans Jacobi.
1990: Kjærligheten er som døden, alltid levende. Poems.
1989: Nå er alle steder. Poems.
1987: Lili & revulusjonen (A play for Vladimir Majakovskij).   
1987: Ennå allerede.Poems.
1985: Hymner og hypnoser. Poems.
1985: Reminiscens. (A short play)
1982: Jeg tenker,lik en pike som tar sin kjole av. Poems.
1980: Offerfesten. Poems and short texts.

Translations:
2006: Leonard Cohen: Lengselens bok, multi-author cooperation
2004: Laura Riding Jackson: Tid for helvete (A need for Hell).

Music: ismbe.bandcamp.com., also on Spotify,iTunes, and several music videos on Youtube.
Last albums and singles are Hey You (Singel). Blood Is Thicker Than Sun (album), The Norwegian Album, Swim Now I Always Care.
https://open.spotify.com/artist/5riSFy3DtiaW0Z4kvUGLvb?si=5_s_dBRvTJiv4sD8R7yUXg

References

1955 births
Norwegian film directors
20th-century Norwegian poets
Norwegian male poets
Living people
People from Kristiansand
21st-century Norwegian poets
20th-century Norwegian male writers
21st-century Norwegian male writers